Sidi Ali Ben Ziyad Mosque, was a Tunisian mosque located in the west of the medina of Tunis.
It does not exist anymore.

Localization
The mosque was located in Sidi Ali Ben Ziyad Street, behind Dar El Bey.

Etymology
It got its name from a saint, Sidi Ali ibn Ziyad, a jurisconsult from Ifriqiya and a Malikite Imam.

History
According to the historian Mohamed Belkhodja, Sidi Ali ibn Ziyad died in 799 and was buried in this mosque, which means it existed in the 9th century.

References 

Mosques in Tunis